Alan Tuffin  (2 August 1933 – 10 November 2017) was a British trade union leader.

Tuffin attended Eltham Secondary School, leaving at age 16 to work for the Post Office. He became active in the Union of Communication Workers, as its London Union Regional Official in 1957, then taking a full-time post as National Official in 1969, and becoming Deputy General Secretary ten years later. In 1982, he was elected as General Secretary of the union. He and his wife, Jean Elizabeth, married in 1957; and had one son and one daughter.

From 1982 until his retirement in 1993, Tuffin served on the General Council of the Trades Union Congress (TUC), winning election as President of the TUC (1992–93). In 1993, he was made a Commander of the Order of the British Empire (CBE). In retirement, he served on the Employment Appeal Tribunal, and as a director of Remploy.

References

1933 births
2017 deaths
Commanders of the Order of the British Empire
General Secretaries of the Union of Communication Workers
Members of the General Council of the Trades Union Congress
People from Eltham
Presidents of the Trades Union Congress
British postmen
Place of birth missing
20th-century British businesspeople